Iolaus obscura, the obscure sapphire, is a butterfly in the family Lycaenidae. It is found in northern Namibia. The habitat consists of dry savanna.

Adults have been recorded in December.

The larvae feed on Plicosepalus kalachariensis.

References

Butterflies described in 1923
Iolaus (butterfly)
Endemic fauna of Namibia
Butterflies of Africa